Shlomo Amos is an Israeli retired footballer who played for Maccabi Netanya.

Honours
Second Division
Runner-up (1): 1963–64

References

Association footballers not categorized by position
Possibly living people
Israeli Jews
Israeli footballers
Maccabi Netanya F.C. players
Year of birth missing
Liga Leumit players
Footballers from Netanya